The 2008–09  W-League grand final was the grand final of the inaugural season of the W-League, the premier league of football (soccer) in Australia.
Top of the table in the regular season Queensland Roar hosted home-and-away third-placed Canberra United FC at Ballymore Stadium in Herston, Brisbane in the Saturday 17 January 2009 season decider. In a closely contested match, the Roar defeated United 2–0.  Both the Roar's goals were scored in the first half of the match.


Match details

Match statistics

See also
W-League 2008-09
Queensland Roar W-League season 2008-09
Canberra United W-League season 2008-09
List of W-League champions

References

External links
Official W-League Website

Grand final
Soccer in Brisbane
A-League Women Grand Finals